The Virgin of the Seminole (sometimes listed as The Virgin of Seminole) is a 1922 race film directed, written and produced by Oscar Micheaux.

Plot
The film focused on a young black man who joins the Royal Canadian Mounted Police and becomes a hero by rescuing a captive mixed-race woman from a hostile American Indian tribe. The young man later purchases a ranch that becomes the foundation for great financial wealth.

Cast
 William Fountaine
 Shingzie Howard

Production background and preservation status
The film had its premiere in Chicago in December 1922 and was distributed by the filmmaker’s Micheaux Film Corporation. No print is known to exist, and it is considered to be a lost film.

See also
 List of lost films

References

External links
 
 The Virgin of Seminole at SilentEra

1922 films
Films directed by Oscar Micheaux
American black-and-white films
Race films
Lost American films
1922 lost films